The Leicester Mercury Comedian of the Year is held during the Leicester Comedy Festival every February. All the finalists picked are nominated by the UK's top comedy clubs and must meet certain criteria. The competition is sponsored by the Leicester Mercury, a local newspaper, and Equity, the actors union.

Winners and finalists

1990s
 1995 Stevie Knuckles
 1996 Jo Enright, Gary O’Donnell, Barry Train, Colin the Fireman, Marcus Cockrell, Bob May
 1997 Johnny Vegas, Natalie Haynes, Kevin Kopfstein, Leslie Gibson
 1998 Mitch Benn, Reginald D Hunter (2nd), TJ Murphy, Mark James, Mary Bourke, Pete Bennett, Johnny Kinch, Jack Mann, Darrel Martin, 
 1999 Patrick Kitterick, Dominic Frisbee, Meryl O’Rourke, Kevin Clarke, David Keay, Michael Tombs, Kat Nilsson

2000s
 2000 Jason Manford, Jason Whitehead, Silky, Sean O’Reilly, Barry Glendenning, Eddie Kaulkner
 2001 Miles Jupp, Jimmy Carr, John Ryan, Adam Buss, Patrick Monahan
 2002 Matt Blaize, Bill Wooland, Quincy, Rob Mager, Karen Bailey, Nick Gray, Kevin Dewsbury
 2003 Rhod Gilbert, Greg Davies (2nd), Claire Pollard, Simon Amstell, Greg Cook, Donna Spence, Greg McHugh, Marek Larwood
 2004 Matt Hollins, Russell Kane (2nd), Matt and Faron, Brandi Borr, Anna Keirle, Chris Roche, Mel Barnes, Matt Dyktynski
 2005 Debra-Jane Appelby, Dave Longley, Peter Aterman, Lee Bannard, Lee Brace, Quentin Reynolds, Sam Avery
 2006 James Branch, Emma Fryer
 2007 Carl Donnelly, Sean Moran, Matt Rudge, Johnny Sorrow, Jason Kavan, Jim Smallman, Paul Smith
 2008 Henry Paker, Jack Whitehall (2nd), Andi Osho, Gareth Richards, Helen Keen, Luke Benson, Sam Harlan, Tony Simpson
 2009 Seann Walsh, Fergus Craig, Grainne Maquire, Joe Bor, Chris Stokes, Carl Hutchinson, Chris Ramsey, Tom Adams

2010s
 2010 Josh Widdicombe, Ivo Graham, Tom McDonnell, Jake Mills, Rob Beckett, Dan Bland, Ben Davids, Ade Ikoli
 2011 Tom Rosenthal & Ben Target, Inel Tomlinson, Suzi Ruffell, Luke Benson, Henry Widdicombe, Michael J Dolan, Pete Walsh
 2012 Matt Rees, Chris Turner, Darren Connell, Danny Sutcliffe, Richard Hanrahan, Joe Wells, Liam Williams
 2013 Romesh Ranganathan, Lucy Beaumont, Adam Hess, Jamie Demetriou, Danny Ward, Tez Ilyas, Mark Simmons, Kwame Asante
 2014 Kate Lucas, Phil Jerrod (2nd), Mark Silcox (3rd), Dane Baptiste, Dave Green, Elliot Green, Harriet Kemsley, Daisy Earl
 2015 Tom Little, Ingrid Dahle (2nd), Stephanie Laing, Kiri Pritchard-McLean, Emma Kearney aka Penella Mellor, David Jordan, Jake Lambert, Lolly Adepfope
 2016 Tom Lucy, George Lewis (2nd), Rob Mulholland (3rd), Yuriko Kotani, Ed Patrick, Nigel Ng, Twayna Mayne, Travis Jay
 2017 Alasdair Beckett-King, Sindhu Vee (2nd), Alex Mahoney, Ed Night, George Rigden, Kelly Convey, Tom Houghton, Tom Mayhew
 2018 Jack Gleadow, Simon Lomas, Radu Isac, Martin Wratten, Helen Bauer, Catherine Bohart, Rosie Jones, Patrick Spicer
 2019 Daniel Sofoluke, Simon Wozniak (2nd), Kathryn Mather (3rd), Jen Ives, Riordan DJ, Jeremy Flynn, Jamie Hutchinson, Krystal Evans

2020s
 2020 Eric Rushton, Matt Bragg (2nd), Louise Young (3rd), Good Kids, Omar Abid, Mustafa Yasin and Dinesh Nathan (Nina Gilligan had been billed to perform but had to cancel due to health reasons).
2021  Nina Gilligan, Joseph Emslie (2nd), Christian Jegard (3rd), Hassan Dervish, Liz Guterbock, Jessie Nixon, Arielle Souma, Dan Tiernan.
2022  Firuz Ozari, John Meagher (2nd), Hayley Ellis, Sam Williams, Nick Elleray, Lucila San Martin, Louise Leigh, Ashish Suri.

References

External links 
 Leicester Comedy Festival 

British comedy and humour awards
Culture in Leicestershire
Leicester
Annual events in England